The Fiães Sport Clube is a Portuguese football club located in the parish of Fiães in the city of Santa Maria da Feira, district of Aveiro, Portugal.

History
The club was founded in 1932.  Its current president is Carlos Pereira da Silva.  In the 2005–2006 season, the team plays in the Second Division, série B.

Rankings

Stadium

Bolhão Stadium in Fiães.

Equipment

Lacatoni
Fabylak – Tintas e Vernizes

External links
Official website

Football clubs in Portugal
Sport in Santa Maria da Feira
Association football clubs established in 1932
1932 establishments in Portugal